Hair Wars is an annual touring event which has become one of the biggest hair shows in the United States. It is a showcase for artists and salons to create unconventional, elaborate, vibrant hair styles and fashion using primarily human hair as the medium. Creations of note include a spider web head piece by Kevin Carter, a flying "hairy-copter" by Mr. Little, and a full Vegas showgirl outfit by Lisa B.

Development 
Hair Wars was started in Detroit in 1991 by David Humphries (a.k.a. Hump the Grinder). The event began touring nationally in 1994 and has a circuit of about ten cities including Los Angeles, Las Vegas, Miami and New York City.

A documentary was made about the event in 1999 by Andrew Dosunmu called Hot Irons.
Hair Wars is featured in recent 2007 award-winning documentary feature film on Black hair called, My Nappy Roots: A Journey Through Black Hair-itage. The film featured revealing interviews with top hair entertainers including Mr Little, Big Bad D, Steven Noss, Little Willie, Colors and others and the inspiration of David Humphries.  
In 2007, a book documenting several years of the event in photographs and interview was released, Hair Wars by David Yellen and Johanna Lenander. 

"Hair Wars The Supreme Salon Tour" Top SALONS compete down the RUNWAY for the title "Supreme Salon" in a THEMED runway show that is judged and awarded. This show produced by Windy City Media's entertainment director, Benjamin Moline  and marketing director, Dan Baron.  Hosted by celebrity hair stylist Ben Mollin, from the hit BRAVO TV show "Shear Genius". The top three salons in each city will move on to a National Finals that are held in Las Vegas.

See also 
 African American hair

External links
Hair Wars US Tour Website
Hair Wars The Supreme Salon Tour Website
Metro Times article April 7, 2004
 Hair Wars book website
NPR piece, February 20, 2008
Images from  Hair Wars  book
Radar Online images

1990s fashion
African-American hair
Fashion events in the United States
Hairdressing
Recurring events established in 1991
1991 establishments in Michigan